Martine Gjøs (born 19 January 2000) is a Norwegian professional racing cyclist, who currently rides for UCI Women's Continental Team . She rode in the women's road race event at the 2020 UCI Road World Championships.

References

External links

2000 births
Living people
Norwegian female cyclists
Place of birth missing (living people)
People from Horten
Sportspeople from Vestfold og Telemark